Paul John Lane, Jr.  (born January 30, 1960) is a former American football defensive back in the National Football League. He attended high school at Staples High School. He played college football at the University of Mississippi. Lane was featured in the ESPN "30 for 30" "Year of the Scab".

References

1960 births
Living people
Sportspeople from Norwalk, Connecticut
American football defensive backs
Ole Miss Rebels football players
Kansas City Chiefs players
New York Jets players
Washington Redskins players
National Football League replacement players
Players of American football from Connecticut